Royal Army may refer to:

Past
French Royal Army ("Royal Army"), an army from 1652 to 1830
Royal Albanian Army ("Royal Army"), an army from 1924 to 1939
Royal Hungarian Army
Royal Italian Army ("Royal Army"), an army from 1861 to 1946
Royal Sardinian Army, from 1416 until it became the Royal Italian Army on 4 May 1861
Royal Saxon Army
Royal Serbian Army, the army of Serbia that existed between 1882 and 1918
Royal Yugoslav Army, the army of Yugoslavia from 1918 to 1941

Present

In Asia
Royal Bahraini Army
Royal Cambodian Army
Royal Jordanian Army
Royal Army of Oman ("Royal Army")
Royal Thai Army

Elsewhere
Royal Danish Army
Royal Moroccan Army ("Royal Army")
Royal Netherlands Army ("Royal Army")

See also
British Army, often mistakenly referred to as "Royal"
Imperial Army (disambiguation)
Royal Navy (disambiguation)